Walax Davi de Souza Magno or simply Walax (born November 11, 1987 in Belém), is a Brazilian attacking midfielder. He has played for Cruzeiro of the Campeonato Brasileiro Série A.

Contract
26 August 2006 to 31 December 2007

External links
 CBF
 América devolve pacote de seis jogadores ao Cruzeiro

1987 births
Living people
Brazilian footballers
Paysandu Sport Club players
Cruzeiro Esporte Clube players
América Futebol Clube (MG) players
Esporte Clube Itaúna players
Association football midfielders
Sportspeople from Belém